John K. Mahoney (September 9, 1949 – April 5, 2011) was a former member of the Ohio Senate, representing the 10th District from January 3, 1977 – December 31, 1980. While in the Senate, he was initiated reform that influenced what today is the Ohio Lottery. He died of lymphoma.

Early life and education 
Mahoney was born in Springfield, Ohio to Jack and Mary Ann Mahoney. He had six brothers and two sisters. He attended Catholic Central High School and Spalding University.

Career 
From 1973 to 1976, Mahoney was a Springfield City Commissioner. From 1977 to 1980, he represented the 10th district in the Ohio State Senate. From 1981 to 1985, Mahoney was chief of staff for Ohio Senate Democrats. In 1986, Mahoney became the Deputy Director of the Ohio Municipal League.

See also
Politics of Ohio

References

1949 births
Democratic Party Ohio state senators
Politicians from Springfield, Ohio
2011 deaths